The women's 4 × 200 metre freestyle relay competition at the 2018 Pan Pacific Swimming Championships took place on August 10 at the Tokyo Tatsumi International Swimming Center. The defending champion was the United States.

Records
Prior to this competition, the existing world and Pan Pacific records were as follows:

Results
All times are in minutes and seconds.

Final 
The final was held on 10 August from 18:00.

References

2018 Pan Pacific Swimming Championships